Windle may refer to:

Companies
 Windle (sidecar)

Places
 Windle, St Helens, Merseyside, England

People
 Bertram Windle (1858–1929), British scientist
 Bob Windle (born 1944), Australian swimmer
 Janice Woods Windle (born 1938), American author
 Jeanette Windle (fl. 2000s–2010s), American writer
 Jordan Windle (born 2003), Cambodian born American diver
 Tom Windle (born c. 1999), English footballer
 William F. Windle (1898–1985), American anatomist and experimental neurologist

See also
 Windley (disambiguation)

English-language surnames